Anopinella is a genus of moths belonging to the family Tortricidae.

Species
fana species group
Anopinella alshiana  Razowski & Pelz, 2003
Anopinella aurea  Razowski & Becker, 2000
Anopinella boliviana  Brown & Adamski, 2003
Anopinella brasiliana  Brown & Adamski, 2003 
Anopinella choko  Brown & Adamski, 2003 
Anopinella consecta  Razowski & Pelz, 2003
Anopinella cuzco  Brown & Adamski, 2003
Anopinella fana  Brown & Adamski, 2003
Anopinella granadana Razowski & Wojtusiak, 2010
Anopinella holandia Brown & Adamski, 2003
Anopinella larana  Brown & Adamski, 2003
Anopinella macrosema  Brown & Adamski, 2003
Anopinella panamana  Brown & Adamski, 2003
Anopinella perblanda  Razowski & Becker, 2000
Anopinella peruvensis  Brown & Adamski, 2003
Anopinella phillipsae Brown & Adamski, 2003
Anopinella rica  Brown & Adamski, 2003
Anopinella rigidana  Brown & Adamski, 2003
Anopinella rotunda Razowski & Wojtusiak, 2010
Anopinella sympatrica  Brown & Adamski, 2003
Anopinella tenebricosa  Razowski & Pelz, 2003
Anopinella tinalandana  Brown & Adamski, 2003
Anopinella tucki  Brown & Adamski, 2003
isodelta species group
Anopinella albolinea  Brown & Adamski, 2003
Anopinella araguana  Brown & Adamski, 2003
Anopinella arenalana  Brown & Adamski, 2003
Anopinella cafrosana  Brown & Adamski, 2003
Anopinella carabayana  Brown & Adamski, 2003
Anopinella cartagoa  Brown & Adamski, 2003
Anopinella isodelta  Meyrick, 1912
Anopinella mariana  Brown & Adamski, 2003
Anopinella ophiodes  Walsingham, 1914
Anopinella parambana  Brown & Adamski, 2003
Anopinella porrasa  Brown & Adamski, 2003
Anopinella powelli  Brown & Adamski, 2003
Anopinella rastafariana  Brown & Adamski, 2003
Anopinella razowskii  Brown & Adamski, 2003
Anopinella tergemina Razowski & Wojtusiak, 2010
Anopinella transecta  Brown & Adamski, 2003
Anopinella triquetra  Walsingham, 1914
styraxivora species group
Anopinella styraxivora  Brown & Adamski, 2003
unknown species group
Anopinella shillanana Razowski & Wojtusiak, 2009
Anopinella tariquiae Razowski & Wojtusiak, 2013
Anopinella yangana Razowski & Wojtusiak, 2009

References

 , 1986, Pan-Pacif. Ent. 62: 394.
 , 2005: World Catalogue of Insects volume 5 Tortricidae.
 , 2009: Tortricidae (Lepidoptera) from the mountains of Ecuador and remarks on their geographical distribution. Part IV. Eastern Cordillera. Acta Zoologica Cracoviensia 51B (1-2): 119-187. doi:10.3409/azc.52b_1-2.119-187. Full article: .
 , 2010: Tortricidae (Lepidoptera) from Peru. Acta Zoologica Cracoviensia 53B (1-2): 73-159. . Full article: .

External links

tortricidae.com
Systematic revision of Anopinella Powell (Lepidoptera: Tortricidae: Euliini) and phylogenetic analysis of the Apolychrosis group of genera

 
Euliini
Tortricidae genera